HAX accelerator  (formerly HAXLR8R) is an early stage investor and seed accelerator focused on hard tech startups. HAX has offices in San Francisco, Shenzhen, and Tokyo.

History

Founded in 2011 by Cyril Ebersweiler and Sean O'Sullivan, the roots of the HAX Accelerator were another accelerator program, CHINA-AXLR8R started in Dalian, China in 2009. The first HAX Accelerator program ran in Shenzhen from March to June 2012.

HAX, focused on hardware development, includes both a cash investment and product development support in exchange for equity. Startups that are accepted into the program spend 180 days with the HAX team at their locations in Shenzhen and San Francisco. The startups get access to the supply chain and factory ecosystem available in Shenzhen. 
At the end of the program the startup presents the final product to investors and raise further capital both HAX and investor network.

As of June 2020, over 250 startups participated in the programs. Among them are:
 Makeblock, a Shenzhen-based STEM robotics company
 Robotics companies such as Simbe Robotics (inventory robot), Dispatch (delivery robot) and Rovenso (all-terrain rover)
 11 startups who raised over one million dollars on Kickstarter including CHIP, Kokoon, Prynt
 M5Stack, a Shenzhen-based company making stackable product development toolkits based on ESP32, targeting applications such as STEM Learning and IoT. In 2017, the founder of M5Stack, Jimmy Lai, received a seed round investment from HAX and officially founded M5Stack.

References

External links 
Official website

Business incubators of China
Startup accelerators